Ichabod Alden (August 11, 1739 – November 11, 1778) was an American Revolutionary War officer and commanding officer during the Cherry Valley Massacre.

Early life and family 
The great-grandson of the Mayflower pilgrim John Alden, Ichabod Alden was born in Duxbury, Massachusetts.

Career 
Appointed Lieutenant Colonel of the Plymouth militia regiment in 1775, Alden first saw action serving with the 25th Continental Regiment during the Siege of Boston. Following his promotion to Colonel in November 1776, Alden was assigned to the 7th Massachusetts Regiment stationed at the garrison of Cherry Valley, New York. Although commanding between 200 and 300 men, Alden's limited military experience and lack of knowledge regarding local Indian tactics or customs would prove to be a great disadvantage as in early November 1778, receiving a warning of an attack by local tribes, Alden made minimal preparations.

On November 11, 1778, a combined force of 600 ns led by Joseph Brant and 200 Tories known as Butler's Rangers under Major Walter Butler launched a surprise attack after the capture of several of Alden's scouts provided intelligence of the situation in the valley. In the attack 32 civilians and 16 soldiers were killed, and 71 residents were captured. The officers of the regiment were quartered in private homes, and Alden was killed in an attempt to reach the fort from a house on the outskirts of the fort. His executive officer, Lt. Col. William Stacy, was taken prisoner. The attack, retaliation for the defeat at the Battle of Oriskany, would later provoke an expedition against the villages and agricultural crops of the Iroquois League led by Gen. John Sullivan in 1779.

References
 
McHenry, Robert. Webster's American Military Biographies, Springfield, Mass.: G & C. Merriam Co., 1978.

1739 births
1778 deaths
United States military personnel killed in the American Revolutionary War
Continental Army officers from Massachusetts
People from Duxbury, Massachusetts